Events in the year 2006 in Japan.

Incumbents
 Emperor: Akihito
 Prime Minister: Junichiro Koizumi (L–Kanagawa) to September 26 Shinzō Abe (L–Yamaguchi)
 Chief Cabinet Secretary: Shinzō Abe (L–Yamaguchi) to September 26 Yasuhisa Shiozaki (L–Ehime)
 Chief Justice of the Supreme Court: Akira Machida to October 15 Nirō Shimada from October 16
 President of the House of Representatives: Yōhei Kōno (L–Kanagawa)
 President of the House of Councillors: Chikage Ōgi (L–proportional)
 Diet sessions: 164th (regular, January 20 to June 18), 165th (extraordinary, September 26 to December 19)

Governors
Aichi Prefecture: Masaaki Kanda 
Akita Prefecture: Sukeshiro Terata 
Aomori Prefecture: Shingo Mimura
Chiba Prefecture: Akiko Dōmoto 
Ehime Prefecture: Moriyuki Kato 
Fukui Prefecture: Issei Nishikawa 
Fukuoka Prefecture: Wataru Asō 
Fukushima Prefecture: 
 until 28 September: Eisaku Satō
 28 September-12 November: Akira Kawate
 starting 12 November: Yūhei Satō 
Gifu Prefecture: Hajime Furuta
Gunma Prefecture: Hiroyuki Kodera 
Hiroshima Prefecture: Yūzan Fujita 
Hokkaido: Harumi Takahashi
Hyogo Prefecture: Toshizō Ido
Ibaraki Prefecture: Masaru Hashimoto 
Ishikawa Prefecture: Masanori Tanimoto
Iwate Prefecture: Hiroya Masuda 
Kagawa Prefecture: Takeki Manabe 
Kagoshima Prefecture: Satoshi Mitazono 
Kanagawa Prefecture: Shigefumi Matsuzawa 
Kochi Prefecture: Daijiro Hashimoto 
Kumamoto Prefecture: Yoshiko Shiotani 
Kyoto Prefecture: Keiji Yamada 
Mie Prefecture: Akihiko Noro 
Miyagi Prefecture: Yoshihiro Murai
Miyazaki Prefecture: Tadahiro Ando (until 5 December); Kayoko Saka (starting 5 December)
Nagano Prefecture: Yasuo Tanaka (until 1 September); Jin Murai (starting 1 September)
Nagasaki Prefecture: Genjirō Kaneko 
Nara Prefecture: Yoshiya Kakimoto
Niigata Prefecture: Hirohiko Izumida 
Oita Prefecture: Katsusada Hirose
Okayama Prefecture: Masahiro Ishii 
Okinawa Prefecture: Keiichi Inamine (until 10 December); Hirokazu Nakaima (starting 10 December)
Osaka Prefecture: Fusae Ōta 
Saga Prefecture: Yasushi Furukawa 
Saitama Prefecture: Kiyoshi Ueda 
Shiga Prefecture: Yoshitsugu Kunimatsu (until 20 July); Yukiko Kada (starting 20 July)
Shiname Prefecture: Nobuyoshi Sumita 
Shizuoka Prefecture: Yoshinobu Ishikawa 
Tochigi Prefecture: Tomikazu Fukuda
Tokushima Prefecture: Kamon Iizumi
Tokyo: Shintarō Ishihara 
Tottori Prefecture: Yoshihiro Katayama 
Toyama Prefecture: Takakazu Ishii 
Wakayama Prefecture: Yoshiki Kimura (until 2 December); Yoshinobu Nisaka (starting 17 December)
Yamagata Prefecture: Hiroshi Saitō 
Yamaguchi Prefecture: Sekinari Nii 
Yamanashi Prefecture: Takahiko Yamamoto

Events

January
 January 16 - Tokyo prosecutors raid Livedoor for suspected violations of securities laws.
 January 18 - Following the Livedoor raid, the Tokyo Stock Exchange is overloaded with sell orders and is forced to stop trading.
 January 23 - Livedoor CEO Takafumi Horie and three other company officials are arrested and placed in detention.

February
 February 1 - Transit operators in the Kansai region introduce the PiTaPa contactless fare card system.
 February 6 - Construction Ministry officials cite Toyoko Inn for multiple violations of building codes and disability access laws.
 February 23 - Figure skater Shizuka Arakawa wins a gold medal in the Ladies' Singles at the 2006 Winter Olympics in Turin.

March
 March 3–5 - Asian round of the World Baseball Classic is held at the Tokyo Dome.
 March 4 - Softbank announces its intention to purchase the Japanese subsidiary of Vodafone.

April
 April 7 - Ichirō Ozawa is elected president of the Democratic Party of Japan.
 April 26 - Takahumi Horie is released from custody.
 April 26 - Hidetsugu Aneha is arrested for his role in the Structural Calculation Forgery Problem.

May
 May 1 - The new Corporations Act goes into effect, abolishing yugen kaisha and altering kabushiki kaisha.
 May 23 – Japanese foreign minister Taro Aso visits Qatar to meet with Chinese and South Korean diplomats.

June
 June - Minato Ward 2006 elevator accident, a 16-year-old student killed in Minato, Tokyo

 June 5 - Yoshiaki Murakami, manager of the Murakami Fund, is arrested for insider trading.
 June 15 - A cross-party organization of 135 Diet members led by Taku Yamasaki proposes a secular replacement for Yasukuni Shrine.

July
 July 14 - Bank of Japan abolishes the zero interest rate policy.
 July 20 - A memorandum from an Imperial Household Agency official is published in the Nihon Keizai Shimbun showing that Emperor Hirohito refused to visit Yasukuni Shrine after Class A war criminals were added to its rolls.

August
 August 9 - Beef imported from the United States goes on sale in Japan for the first time in months following a lengthy ban.
 August 14 - A blackout occurs throughout Tokyo, Chiba and Saitama during the morning rush hour after a barge-mounted crane disrupts a high-voltage line.

 August 15 - On the anniversary of the end of World War II, Koizumi makes his final visit to Yasukuni Shrine.
 August 16 - A fishing boat is fired upon after crossing into Russian-claimed waters off the east coast of Hokkaidō.

September
 September 22 - Junichiro Koizumi's term as president of the Liberal Democratic Party expires.

December
 December 2 - Nintendo's Wii is released in Japan.

Births
 September 6: Prince Hisahito of Akishino

Deaths
 January 3: Shiro Azuma, soldier
 April 29: Yoichi Numata, actor
 May 1: Kikuo Takano, poet and mathematician
 May 6: Shigeru Kayano, Ainu activist (b. 1926)
 May 10: Raizo Matsuno, politician
 May 16: Takahiro Tamura, actor
 May 29: Masumi Okada, actor
 June 1: Shokichi Iyanaga, mathematician
 June 13: Hiroyuki Iwaki, conductor and percussionist
 June 17: Hiroaki Shukuzawa, rugby coach
 July 1: Ryutaro Hashimoto, prime minister (born 1937)
 July 7: Reizō Nomoto, voice actor
 August 6: Hirotaka Suzuoki, voice actor and actor
 August 9: Chinatsu Mori, shot putter
 September 13: Shokichi Natsui, judoka
 September 17: Kazuyuki Sogabe, voice actor
 September 25: Tetsurō Tamba, actor
 October 1: Yoshihiro Yonezawa, manga critic and author
 October 29: Reiko Mutō, voice actress
 November 10: Taira Hara, manga artist and tarento
 December 17: Kyōko Kishida, actress
 December 20: Yukio Aoshima, politician
 December 25: Hiroaki Hidaka

See also
 2006 in Japanese television
 List of Japanese films of 2006

Statistics
Wealthiest person in Japan: Masayoshi Son (net worth US$7 billion)

References

 
Years of the 21st century in Japan
Japan
Japan